Werner "Fips" Fürbringer (2 October 1888 – 8 February 1982) was a successful German U-boat commander in the Kaiserliche Marine during World War I, sinking 101 ships. He was later promoted to the rank of Konteradmiral during World War II.

Early years

Fürbringer was born in Braunschweig and entered the Imperial German Navy as a Seekadett on 3 April 1907. Subsequently, he attended basic training and was assigned on training ship . He also attended the Naval Academy and was promoted to the rank of Fähnrich zur See (officer candidate).

He then spent some time aboard the cruiser , sailing in East Asia within the High Seas Fleet, before being transferred to the Heavy cruiser . During the time of his transfer, Fürbringer was promoted to the rank of Leutnant zur See on 28 September 1910.

Spending another two years in Asia, Fürbringer returned home in November 1912 and was selected for U-boat training.

World War I

He went on to command six subsequent UB and UC-type boats, during which time he was awarded the Iron Cross, Second and First class. He was a successful commerce raider, responsible for sinking 101 (mostly small, coastal) ships (totaling 97,881 GRT) and damaged five others (of 9,033 GRT). The Garrys commanding officer was Lieutenant Commander Charles Lightoller. In his postwar memoirs (1933), Fürbringer accused the Garrys crew of opening fire with revolvers and machine guns on the unarmed survivors after the sinking of UB-110. During the incident, Fürbringer alleged that he watched the skull of an 18-year-old member of his crew being split open by a lump of coal hurled by a crewmember from the Garry. When Fürbringer attempted to help a wounded officer to swim, he alleges the man said, "Let me die in peace. The swine are going to murder us anyhow." Fürbringer claimed the shooting only ceased when the convoy the destroyer had been escorting and which contained many neutral-flagged ships, arrived on scene. He later recalled, "As if by magic the British now let down some life boats into the water." Lightoller was awarded a Bar to the Distinguished Service Cross for sinking SM UB-110. Twenty-one of the thirty-four crew members were killed during the sinking of the UB-110. Fürbringer was captured and spent the rest of the war as a prisoner of war.

World War II
In the inter-war years Furbringer served in various capacities, and at the start of the Second World War he was appointed commander of Submarine Defence Department of Germany's Naval High Command (OKM). In 1942 he was promoted to Konteradmiral, and was Inspector of Armaments in the occupied Eastern Territories. He was released from service in June 1943.

Werner Furbringer died in Brunswick in February 1982.

U-boat commands
Werner Furbringer held command of seven U-boats during World War I
: Feb 1915-Mar 1916
: Mar 1916
: Apr-Nov 1916
: Nov 1916-Jun 1917
: May-Aug 1917
: Aug 1917-Feb 1918
: Mar-July 1918

Decorations
 Iron Cross (1914) 1st and 2nd Class
 Knight of the House Order of Hohenzollern with Swords (27 August 1916)
 U-boat War Badge (1918)
 The Honour Cross of the World War 1914/1918 with Swords
 War Merit Cross (1939) 1st and 2nd Class with Swords
 Wehrmacht Long Service Award

Publications
 Werner (Fips) Fürbringer: Alarm! Tauchen!! U-Boot in Kampf und Sturm, Ullstein, Berlin 1933, . English translation: Fips: Legendary U-Boat Commander, 1915-1918, Naval Institute Press, 2000, .

References

External links
 German bio

1888 births
1982 deaths
Kriegsmarine personnel of World War II
Counter admirals of the Kriegsmarine
Military personnel from Braunschweig
U-boat commanders (Imperial German Navy)
World War I prisoners of war held by the United Kingdom
German prisoners of war in World War I
Reichsmarine personnel
Imperial German Navy personnel of World War I